Twister, also known as Twister: Mother of Charlotte or just Mother of Charlotte, is a shooting game developed by Chris Yates and Jon Hare for Sensible Software and published by System 3 for the ZX Spectrum in 1986. It was originally developed as Mother of Harlots but was renamed after a controversy regarding the title and sexualized promotion with skimpily dressed dancers at an industry event, and a planned Commodore 64 version was never released. The game received positive reviews from Aktueller Software Markt, Crash, Sinclair User, and Your Sinclair.

References

External links 
 Official website
 
 Twister at the World of Spectrum

1986 video games
Cancelled Commodore 64 games
Sensible Software
Single-player video games
Shooter video games
Video games developed in the United Kingdom
ZX Spectrum games
ZX Spectrum-only games